RSGC1-F01 is a red supergiant located in the RSGC1 open cluster in the constellation of Scutum. The radius was calculated to be around 1,530 times that of the Sun (the radius is calculated by applying the Stefan-Boltzmann law), making it one of the largest stars discovered so far. This corresponds to a volume 3.58 billion times bigger than the Sun. If placed at the center of the Solar System, the photosphere would engulf the orbit of Jupiter.

See also 
 RSGC1-F02

References 

Scutum (constellation)
M-type supergiants
J18375629-0652322
TIC objects